The Kennett curse was the name given to Australian Football League club 's dominance against rival  in the period between Hawthorn's upset win against Geelong in the 2008 AFL Grand Final and Hawthorn's win in the 2013 preliminary finals.

Background

Geelong and Hawthorn contested the 2008 AFL Grand Final. Geelong went into the match as the favourites; they were the defending premiers, and had lost only one match for the entire season; however, Hawthorn prevailed by 26 points to claim its 10th premiership. Ahead of the teams' first-round meeting at the start of the 2009 season, then-Hawthorn president Jeff Kennett publicly questioned Geelong's mental drive to defeat Hawthorn.

Additionally, following the upset Grand Final loss, Geelong players made a private pact, which was later made public by Paul Chapman, to never again lose to Hawthorn. Following Kennett's comments, Geelong won the match in Round 1, 2009, and proceeded to defeat Hawthorn in eleven successive matches: a run that included a number of close games and come-from-behind victories that seemed to highlight the existence of the so-called 'curse'. During this 11-game run, Geelong won two Premierships, one in 2009, and another in 2011 which included a 31-point Qualifying Final win over Hawthorn. Kennett's demeaning comments in 2009 came to be seen as the initiating event of a curse on Hawthorn, dubbed by fans and media as the "Kennett curse". Kennett himself (who stepped down from the Hawthorn presidency in 2011) said in 2013 that while he was not proud of what he had said, he did not wish he could take it back. The curse ended with Hawthorn finally defeating Geelong by 5 points in the thrilling 2013 First Preliminary Final, after Kennett's reign as Hawthorn president had ended. Hawthorn then went on to win the Grand Final the following week.  Ironically, Paul Chapman, the player who first mentioned the Geelong players 'pact' to never lose to Hawthorn, played his last game for Geelong a week before the Hawthorn game, having missed the Preliminary Final due to suspension.

Results

Over the period of the curse, the rivalry between the clubs remained strong. All matches were played at the Melbourne Cricket Ground, drew at least 63,000 spectators, and although Geelong won all eleven matches, most matches were close and/or involved one team coming from a long way behind. Nine of the eleven matches were decided by ten points or less, and five by less than a goal (six points), with two decided by kicks after the final siren: Round 17, 2009, with a behind to Jimmy Bartel; and Round 19, 2012, with a goal to Tom Hawkins. The Cats' 11-match winning streak against the Hawks is the longest by any team following a VFL/AFL Grand Final loss to their opponent.

Source: Footy Wire

The losing streak ended as follows:

The curse looked to continue, with Geelong leading by 19 points midway through the final quarter, but Hawthorn rallied and kicked three goals and seven behinds to Geelong's solitary point to overrun the Cats by 5 points. Paul Chapman, who earlier had publicised the Geelong players' pact never to lose to Hawthorn, missed the preliminary final due to suspension. He was then traded to Essendon at the end of the season.

Aftermath
The rivalry still produces exciting games and routinely draws crowds of 63,000+ to each game (the COVID-19 pandemic notwithstanding). The following year, Geelong beat the Hawks by 19 points in Round 5 but then were blown out in their Qualifying Final to the Hawks two weeks after losing to the Hawks by 23. Those were the first half of four straight Hawthorn wins through 2015. The Cats did win their most recent finals meeting, a qualifying final, in 2016 by 2 points. During the home-and-away games since 2016, Geelong has had an overall edge, with Geelong's five wins to Hawthorn's three, including the last three wins.

See also
Sports-related curses
Colliwobbles

References

External links
 Game by game: Four years of the Kennett curse, Geelong Advertiser, 5 July 2013
 The 'Kennett Curse' has nothing on these long-running sporting curses from around the world, Fox Sports, 18 September 2013
A mathematical formula for predicting Kennett curse explained

Notes

Australian Football League
Geelong Football Club
Hawthorn Football Club
Sports-related curses